Danny Jansen (born 15 May 2002) is a Dutch professional darts player who competes in Professional Darts Corporation events.

At Q-School in 2022, Jansen won his Tour Card on by finishing fifth on the European Q-School Order of Merit, to get himself a two-year card on the PDC circuit.

On 1 April 2022, Jansen won a Players Championship event, by defeating Andrew Gilding in the final.

World Championship results

PDC
 2023: Second round (lost to Krzysztof Ratajski 1–3)

Performance timeline

PDC European Tour

References

External links

2002 births
Living people
Professional Darts Corporation current tour card holders
People from Holten
Dutch darts players
Sportspeople from Overijssel